

A12A Calcium

A12AA Calcium

A12AA01 Calcium phosphate
A12AA02 Calcium glubionate
A12AA03 Calcium gluconate
A12AA04 Calcium carbonate
A12AA05 Calcium lactate
A12AA06 Calcium lactate gluconate
A12AA07 Calcium chloride
A12AA08 Calcium glycerylphosphate
A12AA09 Calcium citrate lysine complex
A12AA10 Calcium glucoheptonate
A12AA11 Calcium pangamate
A12AA13 Calcium citrate
A12AA20 Calcium (different salts in combination)
A12AA30 Calcium laevulate

A12AX Calcium, combinations with vitamin D and/or other drugs

A12B Potassium

A12BA Potassium
A12BA01 Potassium chloride (medical use)
A12BA02 Potassium citrate
A12BA03 Potassium hydrogentartrate
A12BA04 Potassium hydrogencarbonate
A12BA05 Potassium gluconate
A12BA30 Potassium (different salts in combination)
A12BA51 Potassium chloride, combinations

A12C Other mineral supplements

A12CA Sodium
A12CA01 Sodium chloride or saline (medicine)
A12CA02 Sodium sulfate

A12CB Zinc
A12CB01 Zinc sulfate
A12CB02 Zinc gluconate
A12CB03 Zinc protein complex

A12CC Magnesium

A12CC01 Magnesium chloride
A12CC02 Magnesium sulfate (medical use) 
A12CC03 Magnesium gluconate
A12CC04 Magnesium citrate
A12CC05 Magnesium aspartate
A12CC06 Magnesium lactate
A12CC07 Magnesium levulinate
A12CC08 Magnesium pidolate
A12CC09 Magnesium orotate
A12CC10 Magnesium oxide
A12CC30 Magnesium (different salts in combination)

A12CD Fluoride
A12CD01 Sodium fluoride
A12CD02 Sodium monofluorophosphate
A12CD51 Fluoride, combinations

A12CE Selenium
A12CE01 Sodium selenate
A12CE02 Sodium selenite
QA12CE99 Selenium, combinations

A12CX Other mineral products
QA12CX90 Toldimfos
QA12CX91 Butafosfan
QA12CX99 Other mineral products, combinations

References

A12